Omoglymmius is a genus of wrinkled bark beetles in the subfamily Rhysodinae, found on every continent except Africa and Antarctica. There are at least 150 species in Omoglymmius.

See also
 List of Omoglymmius species

References

External links

 

 
Rhysodinae
Carabidae genera